The Bulacan Ecumenical School is a private Christian primary and secondary school established June 20, 1988 in Malolos, Philippines.

References

Schools in Malolos
1988 establishments in the Philippines
Educational institutions established in 1988